Claude-Victor Perrin, 1st Duke of Belluno (7 December 1764 – 1 March 1841) was a French soldier and military commander who served during both the French Revolutionary Wars and the Napoleonic Wars. He was made a Marshal of the Empire in 1807 by Emperor Napoleon I.

Life
He was born at Lamarche in the Vosges in 1764, son of Charles Perrin and wife Marie Anne Floriot, paternal grandson of Charles Perrin and wife Gabrielle Guerin, born in 1696, and great-grandson of Pierre Perrin and wife Anne Louvière. At the age of 17 he enlisted in the artillery regiment in Grenoble as a private soldier, and after ten years' service he applied for and received his discharge because of his disgust at the manners revolutionary army and settled at Valence. Soon afterwards he joined the local volunteers, and distinguishing himself in the war on the Alpine frontier, in less than a year he had risen to the command of a battalion. In Drôme, Valence, on 16 May 1791 he married Jeanne Josephine Muguet, by whom he had issue which was extinct in the male line by 1917.

Military career

Revolutionary Wars

For his bravery at the siege of Toulon in 1793 he was raised to the rank of général de brigade. He afterwards served for some time with the army of the Eastern Pyrenees, and in the Italian campaign of 1796–1799 he so acquitted himself at Mondovì, Rovereto and Mantua that he was promoted to be general of the division.

After commanding for some time the forces in the department of Vendée, he was again deployed to Italy, where he performed well in service against the papal troops, and took an important part in the battle of Marengo. In 1802 he was made governor of the colony of Louisiana for a short time, in 1803 he commanded the Batavian army, and afterwards he acted for eighteen months (1805–1806) as French plenipotentiary at Copenhagen.
In that year he married for a second time in June at 's-Hertogenbosch to Julie Vosch van Avesaat (1781–1831), by whom he had an only daughter who died unmarried and without issue.

Napoleonic Wars
On the outbreak of hostilities with Prussia (the War of the Fourth Coalition) he joined the V Army Corps under Marshal Jean Lannes as chief of the general staff. He distinguished himself at the battles of Saalfeld and Jena, and at Friedland he commanded the I Corps in such a manner that Napoleon made him a Marshal of France.

After the peace of Tilsit he became governor of Berlin, and in 1808 he was created duke of Belluno (the title was extinguished in 1853). In the same year he was sent to Spain, where he took a prominent part in the Peninsular War (especially against Blake at the Battle of Espinosa, and later at the battles of Talavera, Barrosa and Cádiz), until his appointment in 1812 to a corps command in the invasion of Russia. At first his corps was posted in the east Prussia but it was later moved up to Smolensk support the invading forces. From here his most important service was in protecting the retreating army at the crossing of the Berezina River.

He took an active part in the wars of 1813–1814, until in February 1814 he arrived too late at Montereau-sur-Yonne. The result was a scene of violent recrimination and his supersession by the emperor, who transferred his command to Gérard. Thus wounded in his amour-propre, Victor now transferred his allegiance to the Bourbon dynasty, and in December 1814 received from Louis XVIII the command of the second military division. In 1815, on the return of Napoleon from exile in Elba Victor accompanied the king to Ghent.

Bourbon Restoration
When the second restoration followed the Battle of Waterloo he was made a peer of France. He became president of a commission which inquired into the conduct of the officers during the Hundred Days, and dismissed Napoleon's sympathizers. In 1821 he was appointed war minister and held this office for two years. In 1830 he was major-general of the royal guard, and after the July Revolution of that year he retired altogether into private life. He died in Paris on 1 March 1841. His papers for the period 1793–1800 have been published (Paris, 1846).

Personal life
Victor first married Jeanne-Josephine Muguet in May 1791 and had four children:
 Victorine (1792–1822)
 Charles (1795–1827)
 Napoleon-Victor (1796–1853)
 Eugene (1799–1852)

His second marriage was to Julie Vosch van Avesaet in June 1803 (1781–1831), with whom he had a daughter:
 Stephanie-Josephine (1805–1832)

Evaluation
Victor had mixed military talents. He was an excellent organizer and tactician. During his time in Spain he destroyed entire Spanish armies with Cannae-like envelopments and even fought Wellington to a virtual tactical draw at Talavera. However he was a timid strategist often afraid of taking risks. Nevertheless, he recognized new developments in warfare and implemented them throughout his career. At the Beresina River in 1812, he made excellent use of reverse slope defenses showing that he learned something from Wellington.

In his book Napoleon and His Marshals, however, MacDonell calls Victor a stupid soldier. He claims the closest Victor ever came to victory is when he changed his name from Perrin to Victor. Dunn-Pattison calls him "Not specially dowered by fortune with talents for war", but does praise his courage and sense of honor.

References

Attribution:

External links

 Claude Perrin Victor Papers at The Historic New Orleans Collection

1764 births
1841 deaths
People from Vosges (department)
Victor-Perrin, Claude
Legitimists
French Ministers of War
Members of the Chamber of Peers of the Bourbon Restoration
Marshals of the First French Empire
Military leaders of the French Revolutionary Wars
Burials at Père Lachaise Cemetery
Names inscribed under the Arc de Triomphe